

Group A

Head coach:  Gao Fengwen

Head coach:  Eduardo Rivero

Head coach:  Chérif Souleymane

Head coach:  Angus McAlpine

Group B

Head coach:  Vic Dalgleish

Head coach:  Carlos Pachamé

Head coach:  David Memy

Head coach:  Horst Köppel

Group C

Head coach:  Mohamed Abdoulraman

Head coach:  Manuel Arias

Head coach:  Sebastian Brodrick-Imasuen

 Nigerian players were selected from school teams.

Head coach:  Giuseppe Lupi

Group D

Head coach:  Carlos Roberto Cabral

Head coach:  Homero Cavalheiro

Head coach:  Roberto Rodríguez

Head coach:  Bertalan Bicskei

References

Fifa U-16 World Championship Squads, 1985
FIFA U-17 World Cup squads